Robbie Simpson (born 14 November 1991) is a British male long-distance runner who competes in marathon and mountain running events. He was a silver medallist at the 2014 European Mountain Running Championships and a bronze medallist at the 2015 World Mountain Running Championships. He won his first international marathon medal (a bronze) at the 2018 Commonwealth Games.

Simpson has competed five times at the European Mountain Running Championships (2009, 2012, 2013, 2014, 2015) and five times at the World Mountain Running Championships (2008, 2009, 2012, 2014, 2015). He won the 2016 and 2018 editions of the Jungfrau Marathon and ranked in the top 20 at the 2016 and 2017 London Marathon. He holds a personal best of 2:14:56 for the marathon.

International competitions

References

External links
 

Living people
1991 births
People from Wegberg
Sportspeople from Cologne (region)
Scottish male long-distance runners
Scottish male marathon runners
British male mountain runners
Commonwealth Games bronze medallists for Scotland
Commonwealth Games medallists in athletics
Athletes (track and field) at the 2018 Commonwealth Games
Medallists at the 2018 Commonwealth Games